New Zealand Today is a satirical news and entertainment show hosted by Guy Williams in New Zealand airing on Three. It features Williams investigating odd and humorous stories across New Zealand. The show began airing on 23 Aug 2019.

New Zealand Today is a spin-off of the Jono and Ben segment of the same name.

History 
After the show's launch in 2019, it only lasted one season before being cancelled as part of Three's cost-cutting measures to ready the station for sale. In July 2020, Guy Williams stated that New Zealand Today had been "resurrected and approved for development", and that a second season would be possible. The show was revived for a second season, which began airing in April 2021, and a third season was aired beginning in June 2022. In December 2022, Guy Williams announced via Instagram that New Zealand Today would have a fourth season in 2023.

A podcast spin-off was launched on 1 December 2021, where Williams is joined by Karen Hill, who featured previously on the show.

Episodes

Season 1

Season 2

Season 3

References

External links 

 
 

2019 New Zealand television series debuts
2010s New Zealand television series
2020s New Zealand television series
English-language television shows
New Zealand satirical television shows
Television shows funded by NZ on Air
Three (TV channel) original programming